The Indo-Pacific gecko (Hemidactylus garnotii) also known as Garnot's house gecko, the fox gecko, or the Assam greyish brown gecko, is a species of gecko found in India, the Philippines, Southeast Asia, Australia, and throughout Polynesia. They are seen as dark gray or brown with light markings in daylight and a pale, translucent colour at night. The belly is orange or yellow. The head has a long, narrow snout, hence the name fox gecko. The flattened tail has a row of spiny scales on the lateral edges. The species is parthenogenic – all individuals are female and lay eggs that hatch without requiring male fertilisation.

In Hawaii, the species is thought to be a long-term resident. Formerly considered a house gecko, it has been displaced to natural habitats by the more recently arrived common house gecko.  In Florida and Georgia it has become established as an invasive species of concern.

Etymology
The specific name, garnotii, is in honor of French naturalist Prosper Garnot.

Description
Snout obtusely pointed, longer than the distance between the eye and the ear-opening, 1.5 to 1.6 times the diameter of the orbit; forehead slightly concave; ear-opening small, rounded. Body and limbs moderate. A slight but distinct fold of the skin along the flanks, and another bordering the hind limb posteriorly. Digits free or with a very slight rudiment of web, moderately dilated, inner well developed; infradigital lamellae oblique, 6 or 7 under the inner digits, 10 to 12 under the fourth finger, and 11 to 14 under the fourth toe. Upper surfaces and throat covered with minute granular scales, a little larger on the snout; abdominal scales moderate, imbricate. Rostral subquadrangular, with median cleft above; nostril pierced between the rostral and three nasals; 12 or 13 upper and 9 to 11 lower labials; mental large, triangular, in contact posteriorly with a pair of pentagonal chin-shields, followed by a second smaller pair; the anterior pair of chin-shields in contact with the first infralabial, and with each other mesially; the posterior pair separated from each other, and also completely or nearly completely from the labials. Tail depressed, flat beneath, with sharp denticulated lateral edge; the scales on the upper surface very small, equal; those on the lower surface larger, imbricate, with a median series of large, transversely dilated plates.

Brownish grey above, uniform or with more or less distinct brown and whitish spots; lower surfaces uniform whitish.

Snout to vent length (SVL) ; tail .

Reproduction
H. garnotii is a parthenogenetic species.

Geographic range
Sikkim, Burma, Malay Peninsula and Malay Archipelago, South Pacific Islands.

NE Bangladesh, NE India (Darjeeling, Assam, Sikkim), Nepal, Bhutan,
Thailand, Myanmar (= Burma), Malaysia,
southern China (Hong Kong, Guangdong, Hainan, southern Yunnan), Taiwan,
Philippine Islands, New Zealand (introduced),
Indonesia (Sumatra, Nias, Borneo, Java),
New Caledonia, Loyalty Islands, Polynesia, Fiji, Western Samoa.

It is also found in Seychelles.

Introduced into Hawaii, Florida, and the Bahamas.

Type locality: "l'Ile de Taiti [=Tahiti, French Polynesia]".

Gallery

References

Further reading
Behler JL, King FW (1979). The Audubon Society Field Guide to North American Reptiles and Amphibians. New York: Alfred A. Knopf. 743 pp. . ("Hemidactylus garnoti [sic]", pp. 492–493 + Plate 401).
Boulenger GA (1885). Catalogue of the Lizards in the British Museum (Natural History). Second Edition. Volume I. Geckonidæ ... London: Trustees of the British Museum (Natural History). (Taylor and Francis, printers). xii + 436 pp. + Plates I-XXXII. (Hemidactylus garnotii, pp. 141–142).
Conant R (1975). A Field Guide to Reptiles and Amphibians of Eastern and Central North America, Second Edition. Boston: Houghton Mifflin. xviii + 429 pp. + Plates 1–48.  (hardcover),  (paperback). ("Hemidactylus garnoti [sic]", p. 84 + Plate 17 + Map 43).
Crawford, Daniel M.; Somma, Louis A. (1993). "Hemidactylus garnotii (Indo-Pacific gecko)".  Herpetological Review 24 (3): 108–109.
Das I (2002). A Photographic Guide to Snakes and other Reptiles of India. Sanibel Island, Florida: Ralph Curtis Books. 144 pp. . ("Hemidactylus garnoti [sic]", p. 98).
Duméril AMC, Bibron G (1836). Erpétologie générale ou Histoire naturelle complète des Reptiles, Tome troisième [=Volume 3]. Paris: Roret. iv + 517 pp. (Hemidactylus garnotii, new species, pp. 368–369). (in French).
Goin CJ, Goin OB, Zug GR (1978). Introduction to Herpetology, Third Edition. San Francisco: W.H. Freeman. xi + 378 pp. . ("Hemidactylus garnoti [sic]", pp. 148, 285).
Gray JE (1845). Catalogue of the Specimens of Lizards in the Collection of the British Museum. London: Trustees of the British Museum. (Edward Newman, printer). xxviii + 289 pp. (Doryura garnotii, p. 157).
Meshaka, Walter E. Jr. (1995). "Hemidactylus garnotii ". Herpetological Review 26 (2): 108.
Smith HM, Brodie ED Jr (1982). Reptiles of North America: A Guide to Field Identification. New York: Golden Press. 240 pp. . ("Hemidactylus garnoti [sic]", pp. 68–69).
Smith MA (1935). The Fauna of British India, Including Ceylon and Burma. Reptilia and Amphibia. Vol. II.—Sauria. London: Secretary of State for India in Council. (Taylor and Francis, printers). xiii + 440 pp. + Plate I + 2 maps. ("Hemidactylus garnoti [sic]", pp. 100–101).
Stoliczka F (1871).  "Notes on new or little-known Indian lizards". Proc. Asiatic Soc. Bengal (Calcutta) 1871: 192–195.

External links
 Reptile database

Hemidactylus
Geckos of Thailand
Reptiles described in 1836
Taxa named by André Marie Constant Duméril
Taxa named by Gabriel Bibron
Unisexual animals